Chromatic is a writer and free software programmer best known for his work in the Perl programming language.  He lives in Hillsboro, Oregon, United States.  He wrote Extreme Programming Pocket Guide, co-wrote Perl Testing: A Developer's Notebook, is the lead author of Perl Hacks, and an uncredited contributor to The Art of Agile Development.  He has a music degree. Also, he has contributed to CPAN, Perl 5, Perl 6, and Parrot.

In 2009, he founded Modern Perl Books, in part to revitalize the world of Perl and to publish materials that other publishers had neglected.

In 2010, he released the book Modern Perl in print and in electronic form, with the latter redistributable freely (though with a suggested donation). An updated edition was released in 2012, with the entire text online.

CPAN
While he may be most currently known for the module "Modern::Perl", chromatic originally wrote "Test::Builder", which is the foundation of most testing in the Perl world.

Perl 6
Chromatic spent several years as the Perl 6 project secretary. He is one of the biggest proponents of "roles" in Perl 6 (what some other programming languages refer to as "traits").

Parrot
chromatic has been a core developer of Parrot. He was also secretary of the Parrot Foundation from 2008 until 2010.

References

External links

 chromatic's personal homepage
 chromatic's Onyx Neon biography
 chromatic's modules on CPAN

People from Hillsboro, Oregon
American computer programmers
Writers from Oregon
American technology writers
Perl people
Perl writers
Living people
Year of birth missing (living people)